Rhythm and Blues is the seventh studio album by Canadian singer Garou, and his eighth album overall. It was recorded in London at The Sanctuary recording studios by producers "SMV" and is a bilingual French /  English dedicated to the spirit of R&B including covers of famous tracks The album contains 6 songs in French and 6 in English.

Track listing

Charts

Weekly charts

Year-end charts

References

2012 albums
Garou (singer) albums